The table shows the current coaches and their records for each National Football League (NFL) team. The longest tenured head coach on his current team is Bill Belichick, who has been with the New England Patriots since the 2000 NFL season. Belichick also has the most wins among active coaches, as well as most Super Bowl appearances (9) and Super Bowl wins (6) as head coach. Other active head coaches to have won a Super Bowl are Mike Tomlin, John Harbaugh, Pete Carroll, Mike McCarthy, Sean Payton, Doug Pederson, Andy Reid, and Sean McVay.

Coaches
Note: Statistics are correct through the end of the 2022 NFL season.

See also
 List of National Football League head coaches
 List of National Football League head coach wins leaders
 List of National Football League head coaches by playoff record
 NFL Coaches Association

Notes

References

National Football League head coaches